This article refers to a specific series of historic telephones. For multi-line phone systems in general, see private branch exchange or key telephone system.

A Multi-Line Extension, or MLX telephone, is a no-longer-manufactured series of digital telephone used with several PBX systems sold throughout the 1980s and 1990s by AT&T.  This series is notable for the sheer quantity of devices operating in the field, and for its after-market continuing long after the manufacturers stopped making them.  Their popularity has also contributed to the existence of a sizeable refurbishment market.

These phones are typically used with the AT&T Merlin PBX system, originally known as the American Bell Merlin, also sold under the Lucent/Avaya names.  The systems they work with include the Merlin Legend and Merlin Magix.  A similar style of phones, with the model MLS, was designed to work on the AT&T Partner systems, but could also be used on the Merlins with optional expansion modules.

Although there are several versions of MLX telephones, all of them resemble typical business telephones, with anywhere from 30 to 80 buttons on their keypads.  Their most common usage is in offices.

Communication protocol
MLX telephones use an unpublished digital communications protocol based on ISDN S interface.  They connect to their host system using an 8-position 8-conductor connector, however only the middle 4 positions are actually used.  The processing for an MLX telephone is done principally by its host - the keypad and display is essentially the equivalent of a dumb terminal contained inside the set.  There are provisions for two independent two-way voice channels and the data channel (similar to ISDN BRI) going to a single telephone set.  Because each channel is two-way, the two voice channels are rarely used simultaneously, except for example, when a voice "paging" announcement comes over the speakerphone while somebody is using the line, or if an additional "multi-function-module" accessory is attached to the phone that permits the second voice channel to be used as a normal analog telephone line, such as for a modem or fax machine.

Variations
Several models of MLX telephones are in widespread operation today, the principal difference being the number of programmable "feature" buttons on the phone.  A "feature" button is an unlabeled button that doesn't come assigned to any specific purpose, but which is meant to be labeled with a paper label and can be programmed either by the phone user or system administrator to perform various functions (such as speed dial, call forwarding, a private line, etc.)  The number in the model indicates how many feature buttons there are (for example, the MLX-10D has 10 feature buttons).  There are models with 5, 10, 16, 20, and 28 buttons.

The model with 20 buttons is an important exception.  That model of phone is designed to be an "operator" phone.  It has a much larger display screen, and also can connect to optional "direct station selector", which is a secondary console with 50 or more buttons that allows quick call transfers to any of numerous extensions.  This model of telephone with its relatively large screen (approximately 24 columns by 7 rows, compared to 2 rows in the other models) can also be used in lieu of a computer for performing the system programming of the host system.

Western Electric telephones